General Zulkiple bin Kassim (born 24 February 1959 in Gong Kapas, Terengganu) is a retired Malaysian General who served as 26th Chief of Malaysian Army.

Post career
Zulkiple Kassim is a Chairman of PH Empire Holding Berhad.

Honours
 :
 Officer of the Order of the Defender of the Realm (KMN) (1999)
 Companion of the Order of Loyalty to the Crown of Malaysia (JSM) (2005)
 Commander of the Order of Meritorious Service (PJN) - Datuk (2012)
 Commander of the Order of Loyalty to the Crown of Malaysia (PSM) - Tan Sri (2017)
 Malaysian Armed Forces :
 Warrior of The Most Gallant Order of Military Service (PAT)
 Loyal Commander of The Most Gallant Order of Military Service (PSAT)
 Courageous Commander of The Most Gallant Order of Military Service (PGAT)
 :
 Knight Companion of the Order of the Crown of Pahang (DIMP) - Dato’ (2004)
 Knight Companion of the Order of Sultan Ahmad Shah of Pahang (DSAP) - Dato’ (2005)
 Grand Knight of the Order of Sultan Ahmad Shah of Pahang (SSAP) - Dato’ Sri (2012)
 :
 Knight Commander of the Exalted Order of the Crown of Kedah (DPMK) - Dato’ (2009)
 :
 Knight Commander of the Order of the Territorial Crown (PMW) - Datuk (2010)
 :
 Companion of the Order of Sultan Mizan Zainal Abidin of Terengganu (SMZ) (2003)
 Knight Companion of the Order of Sultan Mizan Zainal Abidin of Terengganu (DSMZ) - Dato’ (2012)
 :
 Knight Commander of the Order of the Crown of Kelantan (DPKK) - Dato’ (2012)
 :
 Knight Commander of the Exalted Order of Malacca (DCSM) - Datuk Wira (2017)
 :
 Knight Commander of the Order of the Defender of State (DPPN) - Dato’ Seri (2017)
 :
 Knight Grand Commander of the Order of Taming Sari (SPTS) - Dato’ Seri Panglima (2017)
 :
 Knight Grand Commander of the Order of the Crown of Selangor (SPMS) - Dato’ Seri (2017)

References 

1959 births
Living people
Malaysian military personnel
Officers of the Order of the Defender of the Realm
Companions of the Order of Loyalty to the Crown of Malaysia
Commanders of the Order of Meritorious Service
Commanders of the Order of Loyalty to the Royal Family of Malaysia
Knights Grand Commander of the Order of the Crown of Selangor